The Couchepaganiche East River is a tributary of the Couchepaganiche River, flowing in the municipality of Métabetchouan–Lac-à-la-Croix, in the Lac-Saint-Jean-Est Regional County Municipality, in the administrative region of Saguenay–Lac-Saint-Jean, in the province of Quebec, in Canada.

The lower part of the Couchepaganiche East River valley is served indirectly by the route 169 which runs along the southeast shore of lac Saint-Jean. This valley is also served by some secondary forest roads, especially for forestry and recreational tourism activities.

Forestry and agriculture are the main economic activities in this valley; recreational tourism, second.

The surface of the Couchepaganiche East River is usually frozen from the beginning of December to the end of March, however the safe circulation on the ice is generally made from mid-December to mid-March.

Geography 
The main watersheds adjacent to the Couchepaganiche East River are:
 north side: Couchepaganiche River, Lac Saint-Jean;
 east side: la Belle Rivière, Bédard River, Petite rivière Bédard, Saguenay River;
 south side: lac de la Belle Rivière, Belle Rivière, Aulnaies river, Métabetchouane River;
 west side: Couchepaganiche river, Métabetchouane River, Lac Saint-Jean.

The Couchepaganiche East river originates from an unidentified lake in a forest area, located south of the Montagne des Trois Round peaks. This source is located at:
  north-west of lac de la Belle Rivière;
  north-east of the Métabetchouane River;
  south-east of the confluence of the Couchepaganiche East and Couchepaganiche rivers;
  south-east of the confluence of the Couchepaganiche River and Lac Saint-Jean;
  south of downtown Alma.

  north across a swamp area to a bend in the south of the Three Peaks Mountain;
  to the north, forming a large curve towards the west to bypass the Raven Mountain, up to the outlet (coming from the south) of Lake Estaire;
  to the north in a deep valley at the start of the segment, collecting the discharge (coming from the east) from Lac des Passes, then entering agricultural land where the course winds, until 'at the chemin du 4e rang;
  north in an agricultural valley, meandering and cutting the path of the 3rd range West, to its mouth.

The Couchepaganiche East river flows into a bend on the south bank of the Couchepaganiche River, just north of the 3rd range West road. This confluence is located at:

  south-east of the confluence of the Couchepaganiche River and Lac Saint-Jean;
  east of the village center of Desbiens;
  north-west of lac de la Belle Rivière;
  south-west of Alma city center.

Toponymy 
This river was formerly designated "Baillargeon river", "Petit Bras" and "Couchepaganiche stream". This toponym is linked to the main river “Rivière Couchepaganiche”.

The toponym “Rivière Couchepaganiche Est” was formalized on December 5, 1968, at the Place Names Bank of the Commission de toponymie du Québec.

Notes and references

Appendices

Related articles 
 Lac-Saint-Jean-Est Regional County Municipality
 Métabetchouan–Lac-à-la-Croix, a municipality
 Couchepaganiche River
 Lac Saint-Jean, a body of water
 Saguenay River, a stream
 List of rivers of Quebec

Rivers of Saguenay–Lac-Saint-Jean
Regional county municipalities in Saguenay–Lac-Saint-Jean